Ilseong of Silla (died 154, r. 134–154) was the seventh ruler of Silla, one of the Three Kingdoms of Korea.  He is commonly called Ilseong Isageum, isageum being the royal title in early Silla. As a descendant of Silla's founder Hyeokgeose, his surname was Bak.

Family 

 Grandather: King Namhae of Silla
 Grandmother: Lady Unje (알영부인)
 Father: Yuri Isageum
 Mother: Queen Ilsaeng (이리생부인)
 Wife:
 Queen Park, of the Park clan (모후 박씨) daughter of  Jisorye Wang (지소례왕)
 Son: Adalla of Silla (died 184, r. 154–184) was the eighth ruler of Silla,

Background
Reports differ as to whether he was the eldest son of King Yuri, or perhaps a more distant relative.  Modern scholars believe he was likely the grandson of Yuri. He married a princess of the Bak clan. and he was an older brother of Pasa

Reign
He created bureaucratic offices and built a central administrative building. He ordered the cultivation of new agricultural fields.

He is primarily remembered for his 144 edict banning the use of jewelry and other luxury goods by the populace.

During his reign there were several invasions by the northern Malgal tribes. In 146, he suppressed a rebellion by a tributary state in present-day Gyeongsan, Gyeongsangbuk-do.

The tomb of King Ilseong is located in Tap-dong, central Gyeongju City.

See also
Three Kingdoms of Korea
Rulers of Korea
History of Korea

References

 Korea Britannica

Silla rulers
154 deaths
2nd-century monarchs in Asia
Year of birth unknown
2nd-century Korean people